The 2022–23 Danish 1st Division season is the 27th and current season of the Danish 1st Division league championship, governed by the Danish Football Association.

Participants
SønderjyskE and Vejle BK finished the 2021–22 season of the Superliga in 11th and 12th place, respectively, and were relegated to the 1st Division. They replaced AC Horsens and Lyngby Boldklub, who were promoted to the 2022–23 Danish Superliga.

Næstved BK and Hillerød won promotion from the 2021–22 Danish 2nd Divisions. They replaced Esbjerg fB and Jammerbugt.

Stadia and locations

Personnel and sponsoring 
Note: Flags indicate national team as has been defined under FIFA eligibility rules. Players and Managers may hold more than one non-FIFA nationality.

Managerial changes

League table

Positions by round

Promotion Group
The top 6 teams will compete for 2 spots in the 2023–24 Danish Superliga.
Points and goals carried over in full from the regular season.

Relegation Group
The bottom 6 teams will compete to avoid the 2 relegations to the 2023–24 Danish 2nd Division.
Points and goals carried over in full from the regular season.

References

External links
  Danish FA
 Soccerway

2022–23 in Danish football
Danish 1st Division
Danish 1st Division seasons
Danish 1st Division